Gudenå or Gudenåen, is Denmark's longest river and runs through the central parts of the Jutlandic peninsula. An anglicized version of the name often seen is 'The River Guden'.

On its way, the river traverses the relatively high lying region of Søhøjlandet, through the lakes of Naldal Sø, Vestbirk Sø, Mossø, Gudensø, Rye Mølle Sø, Birksø, Julsø, Borre Sø, Brassø, Silkeborg Langsø and Sminge Sø before it empties in Randers Fjord; a long inlet of the Kattegat sea. It is fed by numerous streams and wetlands along the way.

Gudenåen came into existence some 15,000 years ago, at the end of the last Ice Age, when melting ice and glacial streams carved out its bed. The river shelters many species of animals and parts of its course are to be protected under the regulations of Natura 2000.

References

Sources/External links
 The Gudenaa Committee
 
 Virtual journey on Gudenåen in Google Earth
 Gudenåkomitéen A map of the river. 

Rivers of Jutland
Natura 2000 in Denmark